"We Love You Beatles" is a song by the Carefrees. It was a 1964 novelty record about The Beatles and the song peaked at number 39 on the Billboard Hot 100; it was the only Beatles novelty record to reach the Top 40. It was released in the UK on the Oriole label #CB1916 and in the USA on the London International label #10614.

The song was based on "We Love You Conrad" from the musical Bye Bye Birdie and has simple lyrics ("We love you Beatles, oh yes we do!"). Individual verses also have "We love you _ (replace with "Ringo", "John", "Paul", and "George", in that order) along with reasons why the group loves that particular Beatle. It also includes at least three different vocal and instrumental quotations from the Beatles' 1963 hit song "She Loves You", suggesting the fact that "We Love You Beatles" was a reply to it.

References

Musical tributes to the Beatles
1964 singles
1964 songs
Novelty songs
Songs about the Beatles
Songs with music by Charles Strouse
Songs with lyrics by Lee Adams